Diamond Dave is a single by the American indie/pop music duo the Bird and the Bee from their 2009 album Ray Guns Are Not Just the Future.

The song explores the narrator's school girl crush on the lead singer of Van Halen, David Lee Roth, also known as Diamond Dave.

Music video
The music video was directed by Inara George's husband, Jake Kasdan. The director of photography was Brian Burgoyne. 
The video shows the duo holding casting auditions for "Diamond Dave". The actors auditioning for the role include Eric Wareheim, Simon Helberg and Ken Jeong.

References

2009 songs
Songs written by Greg Kurstin
2009 singles
Song recordings produced by Greg Kurstin
Blue Note Records singles
Songs written by Inara George